Cool Hand Luke may refer to:

Cool Hand Luke (novel), a 1965 prison drama novel by Donn Pearce
Cool Hand Luke, a 1967 American film by Warner Bros., based on the Donn Pearce novel 
Cool Hand Luke (soundtrack), a soundtrack album for the 1967 film 
Cool Hand Luke (band), a Nashville-based Christian band
Luke Humphries, darts player nicknamed Cool Hand Luke